Presidential elections were held in Sri Lanka on 19 December 1988. Nominations were accepted on 10 November 1988 and electoral participation was 55.32%. Prime Minister Ranasinghe Premadasa of the governing United National Party was elected, receiving 50.4% of all votes cast.

Background
During the 1988 election, Sri Lanka was in chaos.  In the north and east, soldiers of the Indian Peace Keeping Force battled Tamil Tiger rebels. In the south, government death squads engaged in deadly violence with equally brutal militants of the Sinhala-nationalist Janatha Vimukthi Peramuna. Effective campaigning for both the government and opposition was barely possible.

Both major party candidates promised to abrogate the Indo-Sri Lanka Accord negotiated by outgoing UNP president J. R. Jayewardene and would ask Indian troops to leave the country.

Voting was not held in the LTTE-controlled areas of the north and east.

Results
Aided by its control of the state-owned media, the UNP candidate, Prime Minister Ranasinghe Premadasa, won a narrow but firm victory.

References

 
 

 
Sri Lanka
Sri Lanka
1988 in Sri Lanka
Presidential elections in Sri Lanka